Kurdistan Women's League is a women's organization in Iraqi Kurdistan, tied to the Kurdistan Communist Party. Nahla Hussain al-Shaly, the leader of the organisation, was murdered in 2008.

References 

Communist Party of Kurdistan – Iraq
Women's organizations based in Iraq
Women's wings of communist parties
Women in Kurdistan